Pyeong-dong (Pyeong Neighbourhood) may refer to one of the dong of cities in South Korea:

Pyeong-dong, Seoul, in Jongno-gu, Seoul
Pyeong-dong, Incheon, in Gyeyang-gu, Incheon
Pyeong-dong, Suwon, in Gwonseon-gu, Suwon, Gyeonggi-do
Pyeong-dong, Gwangju, in Gwangsan-gu, Gwangju
Pyeong-dong, Gyeongju, in Gyeongju, Gyeongsangbuk-do
Pyeong-dong, Cheongju, in Heungdeok-gu, Cheongju, Chungcheongbuk-do